Giacomo Fornoni (26 December 1939 – 26 September 2016) was an Italian cyclist. He won the gold medal in the team time trial at the 1960 Summer Olympics After the Olympics Fornoni turned professional and competed until 1969. He rode the Tour de France in 1963, 1965 and 1966.

References

1939 births
2016 deaths
Italian male cyclists
Olympic gold medalists for Italy
Cyclists at the 1960 Summer Olympics
Olympic cyclists of Italy
Olympic medalists in cycling
Cyclists from the Province of Bergamo
Medalists at the 1960 Summer Olympics